San Andrés Airport is an airport  north of Retiro, a town in the Maule Region of Chile.

See also

Transport in Chile
List of airports in Chile

References

External links
OpenStreetMap - San Andrés
OurAirports - San Andrés
FallingRain - San Andrés Airport

Airports in Chile
Airports in Maule Region